Multi-jackbolt tensioners (MJT) are an alternative to traditional bolted joints. Rather than needing to tighten one large bolt, MJTs use several smaller jackbolts to significantly reduce the torque required to attain a certain preload. MJTs only require hand-held tools, such as torque wrenches or air/electric impacts, for loading and unloading bolted joints.

Basics of multi-jackbolt tensioners
Multi-jackbolt tensioners (MJTs), registered under the trademark Superbolt or Supernut, are designed to decrease the torque required to tighten large bolted joints. One of the major problems associated with traditional bolt tightening methods is as the diameter of the bolt increases, the amount of torque required to tighten it increases in the third power of the diameter.
Multi-jackbolt tensioners reduce the amount of torque required to clamp the joint by using multiple jackbolts threaded through the nut or bolt head.
The jackbolts, which are small enough to be tightened by simple hand tools, thrust against a hardened washer and generate clamping force on the joint. MJTs and related products are produced by Superbolt, Inc. in Carnegie, PA.

Types of tensioners
Nut type
Nut type MJTs, otherwise known as Torquenuts, can be retrofitted onto existing bolts or studs. Because of this, they are the most common type of MJT.
Bolt type
Bolt type MJTs, otherwise known as Torquebolts, have a ring of jackbolts almost touching the bolt shank. They typically have a smaller outside diameter than Torquenuts. With Torquebolts, it is possible to have very close spacing even at high preloads.
Thrust-collar type
Thrust-collar type MJTs are used in applications where it is difficult to use threaded tensioners, such as on rolling mills where the joint would typically need to be tightened by crane wrenching.  Jackbolts push a threadless nut against a retainer ring, which is fitted into a groove and transfers the jacking force to the main bolt or stud.  Because there are no threads, they can also be used in press column applications, eliminating the problems and hassles associated with large nut threads.

Mechanical advantage
MJTs have a high mechanical advantage for tightening large nuts.  To calculate mechanical advantage over standard hex nuts, the following formula is used:

Where:

{| border="0"
|-
|MA ||= overall mechanical advantage
|-
|T ||= main thread torque
|-
|Tj ||= jackbolt torque
|-
|n ||= number of jackbolts
|-
|D ||= main thread pitch diameter
|-
|d ||= jackbolt pitch diameter
|-
|A ||= torque advantage of jackbolts over tension bolts (with graphite lube A = 1.37)
|}

Safety
MJTs are a relatively safe bolting method because only small hand or air tools are required for tightening.  Other methods, including thermal tightening, crane wrenching, hydraulic wrenches and sledgehammers, can cause serious worker injuries due to heat, electricity, highly pressurized hydraulic fluid and brute force.  Back and other injuries can also be avoided because no heavy tightening equipment needs to be lifted onto the bolt. Safety is also increased because MJTs prevent parts from becoming loose.

Downtime
Due to dynamic loads, bolted joints have a tendency to loosen.  Downtime is significantly reduced because MJTs are able to easily achieve the large clamping forces required to prevent bolted components from vibrating loose. Therefore, less time is spent tightening joints repeatedly and fixing problems caused by loose joints. MJTs also reduce the likelihood the bolted joint will fail, which reduces downtime caused by needing to replace damaged components.

Installation time
Even though more individual jackbolts must be tightened, installation is still fast in comparison to other methods.  Because the torque required to tighten each small jackbolt is exponentially less than the torque required to tighten one large nut, it takes less time and effort overall to tighten the larger number of  jackbolts.  Also, no additional time is spent moving around heavy equipment to tighten each nut.    Installation processes have been developed using air tools, which also greatly reduces installation time.  Additionally, multiple workers can work on a joint simultaneously since the tooling required is inexpensive.  Another common method, thermal tightening, can take a long time because the stud must be heated, and clamping force is not obtained and cannot be checked until it is cooled since it depends on shrinkage.  If the stud is not at proper stretch, the heating process must be repeated.

Versatility

MJTs are very versatile tools.
They can be used in tight spaces because no bulky equipment is required to tighten the bolts.
MJTs can also be engineered to specifications for almost any application.  There are few size limitations, and they can be used with extremely large thread sizes (as high as  thread diameter).  They can also be used effectively in high temperature applications, given proper materials are used.  Overall, the unique properties of MJTs created by the use of jackbolts can simplify complicated applications, especially for large thread sizes.

Joint integrity

Thread galling and seizing is significantly reduced because mating bolts or studs are loaded in pure tension without twisting.

In many applications, elasticity in a bolt significantly helps to keep a joint held together. Tests have shown turbine-type MJTs increase the elasticity of the average bolting system by the equivalent of four stud diameters, and nut-type MJTs increase the elasticity by 4 to 12 diameter equivalents, which would triple or quadruple the elasticity of the bolting system. In other words, MJTs increase elasticity by adding up to 2 to 4 equivalent bolt effective lengths.  This is particularly advantageous in high-temperature bolting applications where bolts are subject to creep, because elastic bolting systems will take longer to reach a given relaxation stress than in a rigid system. Elastic bolting systems can also improve the integrity of gasketed joints by compensating for temperature changes, joint movement and changes in internal pressure.

Stress relief—Most bolts fail at the bottom of the nut in the first two or three threads.  Hoop stresses on the nut in MJTs cause an increase in diameter at the bottom and decrease at the top, distributing thread stress more evenly and reducing the likelihood the stud or bolt will fail.

Disadvantages
MJTs may not be cost effective for bolts smaller than  diameter, low-stress applications, and in plants where the number of studs/bolts to retrofit is difficult to justify versus prior investment in existing tightening equipment.

Common applications

Presses
Multi-jackbolt tensioners can be used on many press column applications, especially where large thread sizes are required.  Thrust collars ease assembly and disassembly on large press columns, while greatly reducing critical problems such as thread galling and seizing. Multi-jackbolt tensioners are also used on tie-rods, bearing blocks, high-pressure piping, die cushions, cylinder ram bolting, and  anchor bolts.

Mining
Mining applications often require high preloads, and joints encounter high dynamic forces, which can cause joints to loosen.  MJTs can keep joints tight on boom points, ring gears, side frames, hoist motors, drag lines, pinion gears, split gears, and excavator bearing caps, because the joint is loaded in pure tension without twisting.  Some applications, such as toothed rims, require short bolts – MJTs can be useful in these applications because they greatly improve the elasticity of the joint.

Hydro power
Multi-jackbolt tensioners are used in several hydro applications, including turbine couplings, blade bolts, turbine wheel to shaft bolting, pelton turbine nozzles, servo piston nuts, bearing housings, and ball valves. Multi-jackbolt expansion bolts provide additional benefit for shaft couplings, because they generate both radial and axial forces, creating the interference fit necessary.  MJTs can also easily achieve the high preloads required on Kaplan turbine crossheads and servo piston rods.

Steam power
In steam power plants, MJTs are used on boiler feed pump head and barrel casings, boiler circ pump main flanges, stop valves, control valves, turbine couplings, stay rods, manway doors, inlet flanges, and feedwater heaters.  MJTs can save a lot of time during scheduled downtime or maintenance because they require less time to install and remove than other bolting methods.

Steel mill
Multi-jackbolt tensioners have a number of uses in the Steel industry.  Thrust collars can be used on rolling mills, which makes changing the rolls much easier than other methods, and frees up crane time because only hand tools are required.  Other MJTs are used on mill motors, bearings, shaft mounts, anchor bolts, and slitter knives.

Petrochemical
In the petrochemical industry, multi-jackbolt tensioners have been used on reactor vessels, heat exchanger heads, turbine control valves, turbine joints, pipe flanges, anchor bolts, couplings, compressors, and pumps.

Gas compression
Special multi-jackbolt piston end nuts and crosshead jamnuts are used to ease the installation of piston rods, especially considering space limitations.  Other applications include anchor bolts, flexible disk couplings, dehydration towers, compressor cylinders, compressor doghouse bolting, end plates, and gas compression engines.

References

Threaded fasteners
Structural connectors